Brinda Sarathy is an Indian film director, screenwriter, dialogue writer and Poet.

Life
Brindha Sarathy started his film career by working as an associate director and dialogue writer to N. Linguswamy in his debut film Aanandham. However, he didn't work together with Linguswamy again in the latter's subsequent films, but turned an independent director. He went on to remake the 2001 Telugu film Manasantha Nuvve into his directional Tamil debut Thithikudhe (2003). The film starred Jiiva and Sridevi Vijaykumar in the main lead roles, with Shrutika in a main supporting role. It was a moderate success at the box office.

He then had planned to shoot his next film after, again featuring Jiiva in the lead, which, however got shelved for unknown reasons and didn't take off again. After a long hiatus, he again joined Linguswamy as a dialogue writer for the romantic-action film Paiyaa in 2010.

He has also published books of poetry.

Filmography

Books

 Sunday School / ஞாயிற்றுக்கிழமை பள்ளிக்கூடம் (Poetry)
 Birds Shadow / பறவையின் நிழல் (Poetry) 
 Numbers & Letters / எண்ணும் எழுத்தும் (Poetry)
 Pond where fish sleeps/ மீன்கள் உறங்கும் குளம் (Poetry)

References

Living people
Poets from Tamil Nadu
21st-century Indian poets
Indian film directors
Film directors from Tamil Nadu
Tamil film directors
Tamil screenwriters
Screenwriters from Tamil Nadu
Year of birth missing (living people)
21st-century Indian screenwriters